Goodland Township is a township in Itasca County, Minnesota, United States. The population was 466 at the 2010 census.

Geography

Demographics
As of the census of 2000, there were 496 people, 210 households, and 153 families living in the township.  The population density was 7.2 people per square mile (2.8/km2).  There were 348 housing units at an average density of 5.0/sq mi (1.9/km2).  The racial makeup of the township was 97.18% White, 0.20% Native American, 0.20% Asian, 0.60% from other races, and 1.81% from two or more races. Hispanic or Latino of any race were 0.60% of the population.

There were 210 households, out of which 21.4% had children under the age of 18 living with them, 66.2% were married couples living together, 2.9% had a female householder with no husband present, and 26.7% were non-families. 24.3% of all households were made up of individuals, and 8.6% had someone living alone who was 65 years of age or older.  The average household size was 2.36 and the average family size was 2.77.

In the township the population was spread out, with 18.5% under the age of 18, 7.7% from 18 to 24, 24.8% from 25 to 44, 33.7% from 45 to 64, and 15.3% who were 65 years of age or older.  The median age was 45 years. For every 100 females, there were 118.5 males.  For every 100 females age 18 and over, there were 117.2 males.

The median income for a household in the township was $39,375, and the median income for a family was $42,500. Males had a median income of $37,159 versus $21,250 for females. The per capita income for the township was $19,694.  About 2.1% of families and 6.8% of the population were below the poverty line, including 6.5% of those under age 18 and 4.8% of those age 65 or over.

References

Townships in Itasca County, Minnesota
Townships in Minnesota